Huanta Province is the northernmost of the eleven provinces in the Ayacucho region in Peru. The capital of the Huanta province is the city of Huanta.

History 
In the colonial era, Huanta province was larger than it is currently, with traditional ties to the central sierra of Peru, and largely indigenous. The province's capital, also called Huanta, was the site of an ecclesiastical doctrina and the center of a civil administrative district, corregimiento. In a royal census of 1795, Huanta province had 27,337 inhabitants, of which 10,080 (36%) were mixed-race mestizos. Huanta was the site of a major rebellion (1825–28) against the newly-formed Peruvian state. The Huanta Rebellion, led by Antonio Abad Huachaca, is characterized as a monarchist rebellion. It brought together different ethnic and occupational groups in complex interactions.  The peasants of Huanta, called Iquichanos, were monarchist rebels and were transformed into liberal guerrillas. They allied with Spanish officers and merchants, mestizo land owners, and priests to attack the Peruvian republic in the name of the Spanish king Ferdinand VII. It was led by Antonio Abad Huachaca, an illiterate arriero or muleteer, an occupation that brought him into contact with areas outside his home base, since mules were the primary means of hauling freight and trade goods in the colonial era.  The Huanta rebellion was defeated militarily, but the local leaders did not suffer the severe repression that characterized earlier rebellions, most notably the Rebellion of Túpac Amaru II.

In the late twentieth century, the province the Maoist insurgency of Shining Path was active in the region. In the town of Uchuraccay eight journalists investigating the insurgency were murdered in 1983, apparently by comunero peasants. A presidential commission overseen by Mario Vargas Llosa sought to uncover the truth about the incident and produced a report.

Geography 
There is a wide variety of Peruvian ecological zones in Huanta province, with narrow valleys and high mountains.  Ecological zones include the quechua (2300-3500m), the suni (3200-3900m), and the selva alta ("high jungle"), and the punas.
The Mantaro River (by west) and the Apurímac River (by northeast) delineate the boundaries of the province.

Other mountains are listed below:

Political division
The province measures  and is divided into twelve districts.

 Huanta (Huanta)
 Ayahuanco (Viracochan)
 Huamanguilla (Huamanguilla)
 Iguain (Macachacra)
 Luricocha (Luricocha)
 Santillana (San José de Secce)
 Sivia (Sivia)
 Llochegua (Llochegua)
 Canayre (Canayre)
 Uchuraccay (Huaynacancha)
 Pucacolpa (Huallhua)
 Chaca (Chaca)

Ethnic groups 
The people in the province are mainly indigenous citizens of Quechua descent. Quechua is the language which the majority of the population (67.17%) learned to speak in childhood, 32.45% of the residents started speaking using the Spanish language and 0.10% using Aymara (2007 Peru Census).

Authorities

Mayors 
 2019-2022: Renol Silbio Pichardo Ramos.
 2015-2018: Percy Abel Bermudo Valladares, Alianza Regional Ayacucho.

Archaeology 
Some of the most important archaeological sites of the province are Inka Raqay (or Allqu Willka), Kunturmarka, Marayniyuq, Mulinuyuq, Pusuquy Pata (or Ch'illiku Pampa) and Tinyaq.

Festivities 
 Lord of Maynay
 Our Lady of the Rosary
 Holy Week

See also 

 Administrative divisions of Peru
 Ecological zones of Peru
 Kachimayu
 Pampaqucha
 Yanaqucha (Huamanguilla)
 Yanaqucha (Huanta)

Further reading

Cavero, Luis E. Monografía de la Provincia de Huanta, vol. 1. Lima 1953.
Coronel Aguirre, José. "Don Manuel Jesús Urbina: creación del Colegio de Instrucción Media González Vigil y las pugnas por el Poder Local en Huanta (1910-1930)." In Libro Jubilar, 1933-1983, Comité Central Pro-Bodas de Oro del Colegio Nacional González Vigil. Huanta: Colegio Nacional González Vigil and Universidad Nacional de San Cristóbal de Huamanga.
Husson, Patrick. "Guerre indienne et revolte paysanne dans la province de Huanta (Départament d'Ayacucho-Pérou) au XIXéme siecle." PhD dissertation, Université Paris IV, Sorgonne.
Husson, Patrick. De la Guerra a la Rebelión: Huanta siglo XIX. Cuzco: CBC 1992.
Méndez, Cecilia. The Plebeian Republic: The Huanta Rebellion and the Making of the Peruvian State, 1820-1850. Durham: Duke University Press 2005.

References

External links
  Official web site of the Huanta Province

Provinces of the Ayacucho Region
History of Peru
Rebellions in South America